Mikhail Alekseyevich Yasnov (– 23 July 1991) was a Soviet politician. He was  Chairman of the Moscow City Executive Committee and head of Moscow  in 1950–1956.

Between 1956 to 1957 he was the Chairman of the Council of Ministers of the Russian SFSR. Between 1957 and 1966 he was First Deputy Chairman of the Council of Ministers of the RSFSR and between 1966 and 1985 he was Chairman of the Presidium of the Supreme Soviet (head of state) and later deputy. Between 1950 and 1956 he was Chairman of the Soviet of the Union, the upper chamber of the Supreme Soviet of the Soviet Union. He was made a Hero of Socialist Labor in 1976.

References

External links
 Article in the Great Soviet Encyclopedia

1906 births
1991 deaths
Burials at Novodevichy Cemetery
Heads of government of the Russian Soviet Federative Socialist Republic
Heroes of Socialist Labour
Chairmen of the Soviet of the Union
Party leaders of the Soviet Union
Chairpersons of the Executive Committee of Mossovet
Heads of state of the Russian Soviet Federative Socialist Republic